Bedford Modern School Boat Club is a rowing club based on the River Great Ouse at the Harpur Trust / Longholme Boathouse, The Embankment by Butterfly Bridge, Bedford, Bedfordshire

History
The boat club is owned by Bedford Modern School with rowing being a major school sport, currently under the control of Mark Bavington. The club participates in the Henley Royal Regatta, Henley Women's Regatta, Schools' Head of the River Race, and National Schools' Regatta. The boathouse is a three sectioned shared building with Bedford School Boat Club and Bedford Girls' School Rowing Club.

The club has produced multiple British champions.

Honours

British champions

National Schools' Regatta

References

Sport in Bedfordshire
Sport in Bedford
Rowing clubs in England
Rowing clubs of the River Great Ouse
Bedford
Scholastic rowing in the United Kingdom